Oncotylus pyrethri is a species of plant bugs belonging to the family Miridae, subfamily Phylinae that is found in Russia and Ukraine.

References

Insects described in 1864
Hemiptera of Europe
Phylini